The IZh-59 «Sputnik» (ИЖ-59 «Спутник») is a Soviet double-barreled shotgun.

History 

In the mid-1950s in Soviet Union began work on design the first model of double-barreled shotgun in over/under configuration. In 1959, the development of the model was completed and since 1960 Izhevsk Mechanical Plant began its serial production.

Since January 1961, the price of one standard IZh-59 was 120 roubles.

In early 1960s, work began on creating a new model based on the IZh-59 design. In 1962, first IZh-12 shotguns were made, since 1963 began its serial production. In 1964, production of IZh-59 was discontinued. 

In total, 21 218 shotguns have been made.

Design 
IZh-59 «Sputnik» was the first model of Soviet over and under shotguns.

It is a hammerless shotgun, with chokes at the muzzle end.

It has a walnut or beech stock and fore-end. Some shotguns were equipped with rubber recoil pad on its shoulder stock.

Variants 
The shotguns were produced in eight versions, which had minor differences between them.
 IZh-59-2 «Sputnik-2» (ИЖ-59-2 «Спутник-2») - was equipped with a second pair of 650mm detachable barrels
 IZh-59-3 «Sputnik-3» (ИЖ-59-3 «Спутник-3») - was the version of standard IZh-59 hunting shotgun with minor differences in trigger mechanism
 IZh-59-4 «Sputnik-4» (ИЖ-59-4 «Спутник-4») - was the sporting version for skeet shooting, also equipped with a second pair of barrels
 IZh-59-5 «Sputnik-5» (ИЖ-59-5 «Спутник-5») - was the version of standard IZh-59 hunting shotgun with ejector

Users 

 
  - the import was allowed

References

Sources 
 В. Лобас. Универсальный спусковой механизм к ружью ИЖ-59 // журнал «Охота и охотничье хозяйство», № 12, декабрь 1963. стр.38-40
 Л. Е. Михайлов, Н. Л. Изметинский. Ижевские охотничьи ружья. 2-е изд., испр. и доп. Ижевск, изд-во «Удмуртия», 1982.
 Ижевское оружие. Том 1. Ижевские ружья / Н. Л. Изметинский, Л. Е. Михайлов. - Ижевск, издательство Удмуртского университета, 1995. - 247 стр. : ил.
 ИЖ-59 "Спутник" // В. Н. Трофимов. Отечественные охотничьи ружья гладкоствольные. М., ДАИРС, 2000. стр.261-263

Double-barreled shotguns of the Soviet Union
Izhevsk Mechanical Plant products